Cutter's Trail is a 1970 American Western television film. It was the pilot for a series that was never picked up.

Plot
A marshal returns to his home town to find it has been taken over by outlaws.

Production
Parts of the film were shot at the Kanab movie fort in Utah.

References

External links
 
 Cutter's Trail at BFI

1970 television films
1970s English-language films
Films shot in Utah
Television films as pilots
American Western (genre) television films